Aniello Portio was an Italian engraver, who worked at Naples from 1690 to 1700.

References

Italian engravers
Artists from Naples
Year of death unknown
Year of birth unknown